MesoCoat, Inc. is a Euclid, Ohio-based equity backed company providing metal protection and repair.  MesoCoat develops and provides wear and corrosion solutions using surface engineering technologies, serving Oil and Gas, Aerospace, Energy, Infrastructure and other markets.

History
MesoCoat was spun out of advanced materials company Powdermet, Inc. in 2007 to be an independent firm. One of the core technologies acquired and licensed for MesoCoat's start-up phase was developed at the Department Of Energy's Oak Ridge National Laboratory.

In 2009, Abakan, Inc. acquired a controlling interest in MesoCoat.

In 2011, MesoCoat signed a cooperation agreement with Petrobras to help verify the effectiveness of the CermaClad™ process and finance a Euclid plant.

In 2015, Abakan, Inc. acquired 100% of MesoCoat, Inc. 

Mesocoat was put into receivership in 2015 by U.S. Federal Court Judge Denise Cote of the Southern District of New York. Judge Cote appointed Robert W. Seiden as Receiver who steered the company to settlement of a dispute with its creditors and resolved a litigation.

Technology
MesoCoat synthesizes and assembles non-oxide ceramic matrix component nano particles into coating solutions. Its coatings provide wear and corrosion protection to metallic surfaces.

Operations
MesoCoat is owned by an investment group.

Since 2007, MesoCoat has funded its primary research and development activities through government grants, third party licensing arrangements, and venture  and equity financing.

Facilities
MesoCoat broke ground on its first commercial plant in Euclid, Ohio in 2011. The plant is forecast to begin production in early 2013.

Awards
MesoCoat CermaClad™ and related processes

MesoCoat PComP™ and related processes

MesoCoat ZComP™ and related processes

Notes

External links
 http://www.mesocoat.com/
 Best Ceramic Coating for Cars

References 
 http://www.crainscleveland.com/article/20091230/FREE/912309975
 http://www.rdmag.com/News/2010/04/R-D-100-Awards-Technology-that-rolls-on-from-pharma-to-space-travel/: Most recently, Abakan Inc., an industrial surface modification company, has just acquired 34% ownership in MesoCoat Inc., which has developed an environmentally friendly, durable ceramic-metallic coatings that help extend oil pipeline and bridge lifetimes from 20 to 100 years. These coatings have been the recipient of several R&D 100 Awards.
 Forbes.com

Manufacturing companies based in Ohio
American companies established in 2007
Euclid, Ohio